Liskowate  (Liskuvate) is a village in the administrative district of Gmina Ustrzyki Dolne, within Bieszczady County, in the Subcarpathian Voivodeship of south-eastern Poland, near the border with Ukraine.

See also
1951 Polish–Soviet territorial exchange

References

Villages in Bieszczady County